Standard Chartered Korea (officially Standard Chartered Bank Korea Limited, formerly SC First Bank, Hangul: SC제일은행) is a banking and financial services company headquartered in Seoul, South Korea and a wholly owned subsidiary of Standard Chartered. It was created by the acquisition of the former Korea First Bank by Standard Chartered in 2005.

History
The bank started as Joseon Deposit Bank in 1929. In may of 1950, it changed its name to Korea Deposit Bank. In 1954, it made an acquisition of branches of the Korean Bank for Nurturing Industries (a predecessor to Korea Development Bank). The bank was nationalized in 1961 by the military government. It became one of the 5 largest commercial banks in South Korea but it fell into financial trouble during the 1997 Asian financial crisis. It was acquired by Standard Chartered in 2005.

See also

 Economy of South Korea
 List of Banks in South Korea
 Standard Chartered

References

External links
SC Bank Korea Homepage 
SC Bank Korea Homepage 

Banks of South Korea
Standard Chartered
Banks established in 1929
1929 establishments in Korea
South Korean subsidiaries of foreign companies